The Signal Command is a signals formation of the Italian Army. The Signal Command was established in Rome on 1 January 2017 following the disestablishment of the Army Information and Signals Command and of the Signals Brigade.

The Command is in charge of providing C4 support both at home and abroad.

History 
While coming from the history and traditions of the Arm of Signals of the Italian Army, the current Signal Command was established on 1 January 2017 following the reorganization of the C4 sector of the Italian Army.

The Army Information and Signals Command was diestablished in 2016, and the Signals Brigade, based in Anzio, was reorganized and converted in an unified agency.

Commanders 
The Army Signal Command has had two commanders as such:
 Gen. B. Luigi Carpineto (1 January 2017 - 11 July 2019);
 Gen. B. Stefano Francesconi (12 July 2019 - present).

Mission 
The Signal Command is responsible for the construction and management of the field C4 systems to support operations, is responsible for the operation and maintenance of the Italian Army C4 system. and its integration at joint level.

The Signal Command, through the School of Transmissions and Information Technology, functions as Training and ICT Certification Center, as head of the training function of the sector, is delegated, as a pole for information and communication of the Italian Army, to training of all Army personnel in this specific sector.

In operations or exercises, the Signal Command establishes a specialized Command/Staff employed by a superordinate command, framing its own units, or part of them, or other units in reinforcement. The Signal Command units are to be trained to intervene also in safeguarding the institutions, in carrying out tasks for public calamities and cases of necessity and urgency.

Finally, through the Army Signal Command Cybernetic Security Unit, the Signal Command plans, conducts and implements operations in the Army-related cybernetic domain in theater of operations and, if necessary, on national territory, ensuring their protection and resilience and contributing to the Army's overall Cyber Defense (CD) capacity.

Organization 
The Signal Command is part of the Operational Land Forces Support Command, based in Verona. The Commander of the Signal Command is a specialist adviser to the Commander of Support COMFOTER.

The Signal Command controls elements directly subordinated to the Commander, as well as seven Signal Regiments.

Elements directly subordinated to the commander 
Directly subordinated to the commander are:

  Signal and IT School (Rome);
  Army Signal Command Cybernetic Security Unit (Rome)

Operational support regiments 
Four operational support regiments are assigned to the Signal Command. These four regiments provide signals and communications during domestic and foreign operations:

  2nd Alpine Signal Regiment (Alpini) (Bolzano):
  Battalion "Gardena"
  Battalion "Pordoi"
  7th Signal Regiment (Sacile):
  Battalion "Rolle"
  Battalion "Predil"
  11th Signal Regiment (Civitavecchia):
  Battalion "Leonessa"
  Battalion "Tonale"
  232nd Signal Regiment (Avellino):
 Battalion "Legnano"
  Battalion "Fadalto"

National support regiments 
Three national support regiments are assigned to the Signal Command. These three regiments operate and maintain the army's national signal and telecommunications networks.

  3rd Signal Regiment (Rome):
  Battalion "Lanciano" (Rome)
  Battalion "Abetone" (Florence)
  Battalion "Gennargentu" (Cagliari)
  32nd Signal Regiment (Padua):
  Battalion "Valles" (Padua)
  Battalion "Frejus" (Turin)
  46th Signal Regiment (Palermo):
  Battalion "Mongibello" (Palermo)
  Battalion "Vulture" (Nocera Inferiore)

See also 
 List of units of the Italian Army
 Structure of the Italian Army
 Military aid to the civil power

References 

Commands of the Italian Army (post-1946)
Military units and formations established in 2017
Italy